Habergham Eaves is a civil parish in the borough of Burnley, Lancashire, England.  It contains four buildings that are recorded in the National Heritage List for England as designated listed buildings, all of which are listed at Grade II.  This grade is the lowest of the three gradings given to listed buildings and is applied to "buildings of national importance and special interest". The parish was originally entirely rural, but there has since been residential and industrial encroachment from Burnley in its northern parts.  The listed buildings consist of two farmhouses, a cross base, and a group of coke ovens.

Buildings

References

Citations

Sources

Buildings and structures in Burnley
Lists of listed buildings in Lancashire